Charles Sholto Wyndham Marcon (31 March 1890 – 17 November 1959), known as Sholto Marcon, was a Church of England schoolmaster, clergyman and international field hockey player.

Born at Headington, Oxfordshire, the only son of Charles Abdy Marcon and his wife Sophia Wyndham Winter, Marcon was educated at Lancing and at Oriel College, Oxford. On 14 September 1914, only a few days after the outset of the First World War, he was commissioned as a second lieutenant into the Oxfordshire and Buckinghamshire Light Infantry. Following the war he became a schoolmaster at Cranleigh. He was a Royal Air Force chaplain from 1943 to 1945, with the rank of Squadron Leader, and ended his career as Vicar of Tenterden in Kent, where he died on 17 November 1959.
 
At Lancing, Marcon played in the cricket 1st XI in 1907–1908. He was a University of Oxford field hockey blue in 1910, 1911, 1912, and 1913, in his final year captaining the team, and went on to play hockey for England, gaining twenty-three caps. Representing Great Britain in the 1920 Summer Olympics he won a gold medal.

References

External links
 
 profile

1890 births
1959 deaths
Alumni of Oriel College, Oxford
British male field hockey players
Olympic field hockey players of Great Britain
20th-century English Anglican priests
English Olympic medallists
Oxfordshire and Buckinghamshire Light Infantry officers
Royal Air Force officers
Field hockey players at the 1920 Summer Olympics
People educated at Lancing College
Olympic gold medallists for Great Britain
Olympic medalists in field hockey
Medalists at the 1920 Summer Olympics